The Condemned of Altona is a 1962 Italian-French drama film directed by Vittorio De Sica. It is based on the play of the same name by Jean-Paul Sartre. For this film Vittorio De Sica won the David di Donatello for Best Director.

Plot
A father, who is dying, calls together his family, to go over his last wishes.

Cast
 Sophia Loren as Johanna
 Maximilian Schell as Franz
 Fredric March as Albrecht von Gerlach
 Robert Wagner as Werner von Gerlach
 Françoise Prévost as Leni von Gerlach
 Alfredo Franchi as Groundskeeper
 Lucia Pelella as Groundskeeper's wife
 Roberto Massa as Chauffeur
 Antonia Cianci as Maid
 Carlo Antonini as Police Official
 Armando Sifo as Policeman
 Osvaldo Peccioli as Cook
 Ekkehard Schall

Music and Art
The music used in the film is from the third movement, "Eternal Memory," of Symphony No. 11 ("Year 1905") by Dmitri Shostakovich.
The drawings on the walls of Franz's room are by the Sicilian artist Renato Guttuso.

References

External links

1962 films
1962 drama films
Italian drama films
Films scored by Nino Rota
French drama films
French black-and-white films
Films directed by Vittorio De Sica
French films based on plays
Italian films based on plays
Films set in Hamburg
Films set in West Germany
Films with screenplays by Cesare Zavattini
English-language French films
English-language Italian films
Titanus films
1960s English-language films
1960s French films
1960s Italian films